Tuldun is a rural locality (a settlement) and the administrative centre of Tuldunskoye Rural Settlement, Yeravninsky District, Republic of Buryatia, Russia. The population was 471 as of 2017. There are 13 streets.

Geography 
Tuldun is located 22 km north of Sosnovo-Ozerskoye (the district's administrative centre) by road, Shiringa is the nearest rural locality, near the Maly Yeravna lake, part of the Yeravna-Khorga Lake System.

References 

Rural localities in Yeravninsky District